Harriet Dyer (born 17 October 1988) is an Australian actress. She is best known for starring in the television series Love Child (2014–2017) and No Activity (2015–2018). She has also appeared in films, most notably The Invisible Man (2020).

Early life and education
Dyer was born in Townsville, Queensland. She was educated at Townsville Grammar School before attending the National Institute of Dramatic Art in Sydney.
She completed the full-time acting course at the Actor's Centre Australia, graduating in 2011.

Career

Dyer appeared in the television comedy mockumentary series Micro Nation in 2012. This was followed by guest roles on A Moody Christmas in 2012 and Packed to the Rafters in 2013.

In 2014, Dyer appeared in the first season of drama series Janet King as Maya Blakely. In the same year, she starred in the drama series Love Child as Patricia Saunders. She was a regular for three seasons and appeared as a guest in the first episode of the fourth season.

From 2015, Dyer also appeared in the comedy television series No Activity as April. In 2016, she also had a guest role in the drama series Hyde & Seek.

In 2017, Dyer appeared in Kiki and Kitty an Australian comedy series on ABC iview and ABC Comedy. She also starred in the NBC drama series The InBetween playing Cassie Bedford, a woman who can see and communicate with the dead.

Personal life
In August 2017, Dyer was reported to be dating No Activity co-star Patrick Brammall. In March 2021, Dyer and Brammell married after being engaged for five days. The couple adopted their first child, a newborn daughter, in September 2021.

Filmography

Film

Television

Awards and nominations

References

External links
 

1988 births
Australian film actresses
Australian television actresses
People from Townsville
National Institute of Dramatic Art alumni
Living people
21st-century Australian actresses